The speckled darter (Etheostoma stigmaeum) is a species of freshwater ray-finned fish, a darter from the subfamily Etheostomatinae, part of the family Percidae, which also contains the perches, ruffes and pikeperches. It is endemic to the central and southeastern United States. It occurs in the Mississippi River basin and through the Gulf Coast drainages. It is also found in the Clinch River and the Powell River. This species inhabits rocky or sandy pools in flowing waters up to the size of medium rivers with fast currents.

In 2012, studies found five distinct species that were formerly included in E. stigmaeum. In a paper published in the Bulletin of the Alabama Museum of Natural History, Mayden and Layman described five new species, all named after former U S presidents and one vice president, based on their "leadership in conservation policies": 
 Etheostoma teddyroosevelt (highland darter)
 Etheostoma jimmycarter (bluegrass darter)
 Etheostoma clinton (beaded darter)
 Etheostoma gore (Cumberland darter)
 Etheostoma obama (spangled darter)

Description 
Speckled darters, Etheostoma stigmaeum, are a member of the family Percidae. They have a moderately blunt snout, with no premaxillary frenum. They can reach a maximum length of about 2.2 inches. They have both spines and rays, their lateral line is incomplete, and their gill covers are slightly connected by a membrane across their throat. The midline of their belly does not have enlarged scales. They have a sandy colored dorsal side and a yellow or white ventral side. There are 6 dark brown saddles and large specks on the dorsum, with 7-11 dark brown blotches down their body. Mating males have turquoise colored bands on their sides and in their fins, as opposed to the typical dark blue. Breeding females are much less brightly colored than the males. They develop and extended genital papilla.

Habitat 
Speckled darters are freshwater fish. They prefer clear pools of up to 1 m deep, with moderately swift streams. They typically prefer a bottom of sand or sand and gravel.

Reproduction and Life Cycle 
Spawning in Missouri begins as early as March and ends as late as May, at temperatures between 57°F and 62°F.. The eggs are buried in substrate, where there is a relationship between temperature and incubation period, with higher temperatures lessening the time. Typical incubation period is about 9–10 days at about 62-68°F. Larvae hatch at about 4.2-5.2 mm with a functional jaw and well developed pectoral fins.

Distribution 
The speckled darter is found in eastern Oklahoma, southeastern Kansas, western Louisiana, Virginia, northwestern Georgia, western Florida, and in the Dulf drainages from the Sabine River to the Pensacola Bay.

Etymology 
The scientific name for the speckled darter is Etheostoma stigmaeum. Stigmaeum is the Greek word for "speckled".

References
 Page, L.M. and B.M. Burr, 1991. A field guide to freshwater fishes of North America north of Mexico. Houghton Mifflin Company, Boston. 432 p. (Ref. 5723)
 "Etheostoma Stigmaeum Summary Page." FishBase. Catalog of Fishes (gen., Sp.), n.d. Web. 31 Mar. 2017.
 H. Dickson Hoese, Richard H. Moore, V. Farley Sonnier. 1992. Fishes of the Gulf of Mexico, Texas, Louisiana, and adjacent waters 3rd Edition, Library of Congress Cataloging in Publication Data
 Neil H. Douglas. Freshwater Fishes of Louisiana. Louisiana Wildlife and Fisheries Commission, Claitor's Publishing Division. 
 Dr. Lawrence M. Page. 1983. Handbook of Darters. T.F.H. Publications, Inc.

Notes 

Etheostoma
Fish described in 1877
Taxa named by David Starr Jordan